Demiroğlu Bilim University is a private university located in Istanbul, Turkey. It was established in 2006 by the Turkish Cardiology Foundation.

References

External links
 

Universities and colleges in Turkey
2006 establishments in Turkey
Educational institutions established in 2006
Universities and colleges in Istanbul